Bride at any Cost is a 2009 Russian comedy film directed by Dimitri Grachov.

Plot
The protagonist is a successful businessman and an ingenious womanizer who is well-versed in women's psychology. To earn a promotion, he comes into contact with a dangerous businessman with a criminal past, but during negotiations, not keeping his temper, easily seduces his girlfriend, and coming out of her place in the morning, comes across the driver's chauffeur. He faces grave danger if he fails to secure an alibi in the form of a bride.

Cast
Pavel Volya - Stas
Maxim Kostromykin - Kostik
Lyubov Tolkalina - Mironova
Olga Shelest - Mila
Alexander Samoylenko - Treschev
Vitaliy Khayev - Chernov
Oksana Kutuzova - Lyuba Smirnova, the girl Chernova
Elena Tashaeva - Anya
Mariya Shalayeva - Karina
Tatyana Gevorkyan - Tanya
Alexey Malkov - Owl
Natalia Rychkova - Olga
Ksenia Khudoba - Svetlana
Sergey Larin - friend of Karina
Aleksandra Rebenok - Marina

References

External links

2010s sex comedy films
Russian sex comedy films